The name Polly has been used for thirteen Tropical cyclones worldwide, eleven in the Western North Pacific Ocean and two in the Australian region in the Southern Hemisphere.

In the Western North Pacific:
 Typhoon Polly (1952)
 Typhoon Polly (1956) –  made landfall in Philippines as a category 2 typhoon
 Typhoon Polly (1960)
 Typhoon Polly (1963) (T6302, 09W, Auring)
 Tropical Storm Polly (1965) (Tasing)
 Tropical Storm Polly (1968)
 Tropical Storm Polly (1971) (Trining)
 Typhoon Polly (1974)
 Tropical Storm Polly (1978) (T7803, 03W, Bising) – struck southern Japan.
 Tropical Storm Polly (1992) (16W, Isang) – triggered devastating floods across Fujian and Zhejiang Provinces in China.
 Typhoon Polly (1995) (18W, Ising) – approached Luzon before curving out to sea.

In the Australian region:
 Tropical Cyclone Polly (1971) – Category 2 tropical cyclone (Australian scale), formed in the Indian Ocean west of the Keeling Islands.
 Cyclone Polly (1993) – Category 3 severe tropical cyclone (Australian scale), developed in the Coral sea well off the Queensland coast and crossed east of the Australian region where it passed to the southwest of New Caledonia.

Pacific typhoon set index articles
Australian region cyclone set index articles
South Pacific cyclone set index articles